Jerome Dennis (December 6, 1981) is a former American football defensive back. He most recently played for the BC Lions of the Canadian Football League. He was signed as an undrafted free agent by the Indianapolis Colts in 2005. He played college football at Utah State.

On March 15, 2010, Dennis was acquired by the Hamilton Tiger-Cats from the BC Lions in exchange for LB Dennis Haley. He was released by the Tiger-Cats on July 19, 2011. He was soon after re-signed by the Lions on July 20, 2011.

References

External links

Just Sports Stats
BC Lions bio
Utah State Aggies bio

Sportspeople from Los Angeles County, California
Indianapolis Colts players
American football defensive backs
Canadian football defensive backs
Spokane Shock players
BC Lions players
Hamilton Tiger-Cats players
Utah State Aggies football players
American players of Canadian football
Players of American football from California
1981 births
Living people
People from Carson, California